Avoca Dell is a hamlet and north suburban locality of Murray Bridge on the east (left) bank of the Murray River. It is named for the PS Avoca, a paddle steamer built in 1877 that used the location as a landing point in the 1960s. The Avoca Dell Picnic Grounds reserve is situated within the locality on the river bank where the steamer would dock.

References 

Towns in South Australia